Alex Figge (pronounced "figgy", born January 29, 1981) is an American race car driver born in Davenport, IA. He started racing professionally in the Star Mazda Championship, capturing one victory at Portland International Raceway in 2000 while driving for World Speed Motorsports.

Career in racing
Figge competed in the US Formula Ford 2000 championship in 2001, running with Lightspeed Motorsports and Cape Motorsports, then moved up to the Toyota Atlantic series where he finished 18th (partial season), 9th, and 7th in the standings during his three year stay from 2002 to 2004.

In 2005 he made 7 starts in the GT1 class of the American Le Mans Series where he earned one podium and six top five finishes with teammate Ryan Dalziel. In 2005, he also made his Grand-Am Rolex Sports Car Series Daytona Prototype class debut with Dalziel, where they earned a 6th place finish in their only race of the season. In 2006 he drove a full Daytona Prototype schedule and earned 3 top-5 finishes and finished 16th in driver points for Pacific Coast Motorsports, which was owned by Tyler Tedevic, Shelly Tedevic and Tom Figge.

On September 2, 2006, Pacific Coast Motorsports announced that it would enter two cars in the 2007 Champ Car World Series Season, one of which was driven by Alex with teammate Dalziel.  The team struggled a bit with the new equipment and series but they were generally on race pace. Dalziel was let go from the team with two races remaining in the season. Figge's best finish was 8th place in the first race of the season at Las Vegas, which was fraught with attrition. Figge's struggles continued throughout the season, finishing towards the back of the field in most races.

Transition to Tafel Racing
With the early 2008 merger of Champ Car with the Indy Racing League, Figge left open wheel racing in the U.S and transitioned to Sports Cars by joining Tafel Racing's #73 Ferrari F430 team in the American Le Mans Series' GT2 class, co-driving with team owner Jim Tafel, earning two top-6 finishes.

In 2011, Figge made his Pirelli World Challenge Debut as a Volvo Factory driver, signing for a partial season with KPAX Racing alongside co driver Randy Pobst. In his three seasons with K-PAX Racing, Figge has celebrated 5 pole positions, 5 wins, and 12 top-five finishes. In February 2014, K-PAX Racing announced the return of Alex Figge with the addition of new teammate Robert Thorne. The Pirelli World Challenge team also announced the switch from racing Volvos to McLaren MP4-12Cs in the new season.

Motorsports Career Results

American open–wheel racing results
(key)

Star Mazda Championship

USF2000 National Championship

Atlantic Championship

Champ Car

IndyCar Series

 1 Run on same day.
 2 Non-points-paying, exhibition race.

References

External links
 
 Alex Figge at Driver Database

Living people
1983 births
Sportspeople from Davenport, Iowa
Racing drivers from Iowa
24 Hours of Daytona drivers
Champ Car drivers
Atlantic Championship drivers
Indy Pro 2000 Championship drivers
American Le Mans Series drivers
Rolex Sports Car Series drivers
U.S. F2000 National Championship drivers